Kapuka may refer to:
 Griselinia littoralis, a tree native to New Zealand
 Kapuka music, a form of hip hop popular in Kenya
 Kapuka rap
 Kapuka, New Zealand